Muhammed Badamosi (born 27 December 1998) is a Gambian professional footballer who plays as a centre-forward for Serbian club Čukarički on loan from the Belgian club Kortrijk and the Gambia national team.

Early career
Born in Bundung, The Gambia, Badamosi started his playing career at home town club Jolakunda in 2013. While at Jolakunda, he drew the attention of many GFA League First Division clubs. Despite still been a kid, the top clubs were eager to sign him as they saw a brighter future in him.

Club career

Real de Banjul
After a season with Jolakunda in the Nawettan League, it was GFA League First Division giant, Real de Banjul that won the race to sign the newest talent in Gambian football. He began his Real de Banjul in 2015 as he aimed to become the new star in the GFA League First Division. However, he didn't realized his dream as he had to cut his Real de Banjul career short to move to the Senegal Premier League. He made less than 15 appearances for Real de Banjul and score two goals before departing the club in 2016.

Olympique de Ngor
After spending less than a full season with Real de Banjul, Badamosi moved to Senegal Premier League club, Olympique de Ngor on a season loan from Real de Banjul. He may not have had the opportunity to get the goals rolling at the back of the net in the GFA League First Division, but he made use of his time in Senegal as he became one of the best finishers in Senegalese football. Just in his first year, he registered seven goals in thirteen appearances as he became the target of several top clubs.

FUS Rabat
After a season with Olympique de Ngor, Badamosi would go on to be the target of many clubs in Senegal and other top African countries. Following negotiations with several to top clubs, he made a permanent switch to Morocco Botola club, FUS Rabat. He joined the club on a four-year deal. He made his debut against Raja Casablanca on September 26, 2017 in the Moroccan Throne Cup match which played to a goalless draw. He scored his first Botola goal in FUS Rabat 2–0 win of Racing de Casablanca on 28 October 2017.

Kortrijk
On 5 October 2020, he signed a four-year contract with Kortrijk in Belgium. Due to visa delays, he did not arrive to Belgium until three weeks later.

Loan to Čukarički
In the summer of 2022, Badamosi joined Čukarički in Serbia on loan with an option to buy.

International career

Youth
After some brilliant performances in the GFA League First Division, Badamosi was invited by Gambia U-20 coach, Omar Sise in 2016 to attend a trial for the Gambia U-20 ahead of a crucial match against the Guinea U-20 national team in the 2017 Africa U-20 Cup of Nations qualifiers. Out of the 35 players invited, he made the final list of players for the match against Guinea. His Gambia U-20 debut ended not in the best way as Gambia lost to Guinea 2–1 in Conakry to exit the 2017 Africa U-20 Cup of Nations qualifiers.

Senior
Less than a year after joining FUS Rabat, he was given a call-up to the senior Gambia national football team for a friendly match against Morocco.

He played in the 2021 Africa cup of Nations, his national team's first continental tournament, where they made a sensational quarter-final.

References

External links
 

1998 births
People from Serekunda
Living people
Gambian footballers
The Gambia under-20 international footballers
The Gambia international footballers
Association football forwards
Real de Banjul FC players
Olympique de Ngor players
Fath Union Sport players
K.V. Kortrijk players
FK Čukarički players
Botola players
Belgian Pro League players
Serbian SuperLiga players
2021 Africa Cup of Nations players
Gambian expatriate footballers
Expatriate footballers in Senegal
Gambian expatriate sportspeople in Senegal
Expatriate footballers in Morocco
Gambian expatriate sportspeople in Morocco
Expatriate footballers in Belgium
Gambian expatriate sportspeople in Belgium
Expatriate footballers in Serbia
Gambian expatriate sportspeople in Serbia